More! is the fourth studio album by Berlin-based electronic band Booka Shade, released in 2010 on Get Physical Music.

Track listing

References

2010 albums
Booka Shade albums